Weller Pond is a  wilderness pond  southwest of the village of Saranac Lake in the Adirondacks in northern New York within Franklin County. It is connected to Middle Saranac Lake and is entirely state-owned. It sits in the shadow of Boot Bay Mountain; there is a canoe carry to Upper Saranac Lake. It is a popular paddling and cross-country skiing destination.

There are five public campsites on the pond, which are part of the Saranac Islands Public Campground. Weller Pond was made famous by Martha Reben's The Healing Woods, a memoir of her experiences camping on its shore in 1931 while attempting a self-cure of tuberculosis.

References 

Jamieson, Paul and Morris, Donald, Adirondack Canoe Waters, North Flow, Lake George, NY: Adirondack Mountain Club, 1987. .

External links 
New York State DEC - Camping Information
Women of Courage Profiles - Martha Reben

Adirondacks
Protected areas of Franklin County, New York
Ponds of New York (state)
Bodies of water of Franklin County, New York